Slavljevići is a village in the municipality of Trnovo, Republika Srpska, Bosnia and Herzegovina.

References

Populated places in Trnovo, Republika Srpska